Untouched may refer to:

 Untouched (album), by the Emotions, 1971
 "Untouched" (song), by the Veronicas, 2007
 Untouched (film), a 1954 Mexican film
 "Untouched" (Angel), a television episode
 Untouched, a pirated movie release type